Nogara is a comune (municipality) in the Province of Verona in the Italian region Veneto, located about  southwest of Venice and about  south of Verona.

Nogara borders the following municipalities: Erbè, Gazzo Veronese, Isola della Scala, Salizzole, Sanguinetto, and Sorgà.

Main sights
 Chapel of St. Peter, known from 905. 
 This was the pieve from which Nogara gradually grew during the early Middle Ages.
 Church of St. Sylvester (12th century).
 Church of St. Gregory the Great (1533).
Palazzo Maggi (16th century).
Villa Marogna (1548)

Demographic evolution

References

External links

 Official website

Cities and towns in Veneto